John Calvin Wilson House is a historic home located near Indiantown, Williamsburg County, South Carolina.  It was built about 1847, and is a two-story, five bay, frame central-hall plan I-house. It features a shed roofed, one-story "Carolina" or "rain porch" supported by four stuccoed brick columns. A one-story frame rear wing was added in 1939. John Calvin Wilson was a politician and a successful planter. He died at Richmond, Virginia of complications from a thigh wound sustained in the Battle of Cold Harbor.

It was listed on the National Register of Historic Places in 1982.

References

Houses on the National Register of Historic Places in South Carolina
Houses completed in 1847
Houses in Williamsburg County, South Carolina
National Register of Historic Places in Williamsburg County, South Carolina
1847 establishments in South Carolina